Józef Pawlusiak (born 16 September 1956) is a Polish skier. He competed in the Nordic combined event at the 1980 Winter Olympics.

References

External links
 

1956 births
Living people
Polish male Nordic combined skiers
Olympic Nordic combined skiers of Poland
Nordic combined skiers at the 1980 Winter Olympics
People from Bielsko County
20th-century Polish people